Rodrigo Gral (born 21 February 1977) is a Brazilian former professional footballer.

Career
Gral has played in Japan and made his J1 League debut for Júbilo Iwata against Consadole Sapporo on 17 March 2002, and marked the occasion in front of the home crowd at Yamaha Stadium by scoring a goal. He has been one of the most prolific goalscorers in the J1 League since he came to Japan in 2002, having scored at a rate of more than a goal every two games.

Before joining Júbilo Iwata, Gral previously played in his native Brazil for Grêmio, Juventude, Flamengo, and Sport Recife.

He also utilized Roberto Assis as his agent for a period of time.

Gral has represented Brazil in the 1999 FIFA World Youth Championship. He scored once in the finals, against Zambia.

References

External links

1977 births
Living people
Brazilian footballers
Brazil under-20 international footballers
Brazilian expatriate footballers
Brazilian expatriate sportspeople in Brunei
Expatriate footballers in Japan
Expatriate footballers in Qatar
Expatriate footballers in Brunei
CR Flamengo footballers
Grêmio Foot-Ball Porto Alegrense players
Sport Club do Recife players
Esporte Clube Juventude players
Esporte Clube Bahia players
Santa Cruz Futebol Clube players
Associação Chapecoense de Futebol players
Júbilo Iwata players
Yokohama F. Marinos players
Omiya Ardija players
J1 League players
Brazilian people of German descent
Al Sadd SC players
DPMM FC players
Association football forwards
People from Chapecó
Qatar Stars League players
FC Djursland players
Sportspeople from Santa Catarina (state)